Spiritual Frontiers Fellowship or SFF was founded by Arthur Ford in 1956. Their mission is to be "an interfaith, non-profit movement" of religious leaders, writers, and business and professional persons who feel a kinship with and have a concern for the growing Western interest in altered states of consciousness and mystical experiences.

Religious organizations established in 1956
Spiritual organizations